The Little League World Series is an annual baseball tournament for children—typically boys—aged 10 to 12 years old, held in the Eastern United States. Originally called the National Little League Tournament, it was later renamed for the World Series in Major League Baseball. The Series was first held in 1947 and is held every August in South Williamsport, Pennsylvania; while the postal address of the organization is in Williamsport, the Series itself is played at Howard J. Lamade Stadium and Volunteer Stadium at the Little League headquarters complex in South Williamsport.

Initially, only teams from the United States competed in the Series, but it has since become a worldwide tournament. The tournament has gained popular renown, especially in the United States, where games from the Series and even from regional tournaments are broadcast on ESPN. Teams from the United States have won a plurality of the series, although from 1969 to 1991 teams from Taiwan dominated the series, winning in 15 out of those 23 years. Taiwan's dominance during those years has been attributed to a national effort to combat its perceived diplomatic isolation around the world. From 2010 through 2017, teams from Tokyo, Japan, similarly dominated the series, winning five of those matchups.

While the Little League Baseball World Series is frequently referred to as just the Little League World Series, it is actually one of seven World Series tournaments sponsored by Little League International, in different locations. Each of them brings community teams from different Little League International regions around the world together in baseball (four age divisions) and girls' softball (three age divisions).  The tournament structure described here is that used for the Little League Baseball World Series. The structure used for the other World Series is similar, but with different regions.

Qualifying tournaments

In the summer months leading up to the Little League World Series, held each year in August, Little Leagues around the world select an All-Star team made up of players from its league. It is these All-Star teams that compete in district, sectional and/or divisional, and regional tournaments, hoping to advance to Williamsport for the Little League World Series. How many games a team has to play varies from region to region. In the United States, the tournaments at the lowest (district) level lack nationwide standardization. Some use pool play or double elimination, while others use single elimination.

In the United States, the fate of district winners varies widely from state to state. In some larger states such as Pennsylvania, New York, and California, the district winners advance to one of many sectional tournaments. The winners of each sectional tournament then advance to a state or divisional tournament, the latter only being held in Texas and California and are similar to the state tournaments held in less populous states. Most smaller states lack competition at the sectional level and go straight from district to state tournaments. A handful of states are composed of only one district, and the district champion is the automatic state champion.

With two exceptions, every state as well as the District of Columbia crowns a state champion, and sends that team to represent it to one of eight regional tournaments. The exceptions involve California and Texas. Because of their large geographic and population sizes, California and Texas send two representatives to their regional tournament; Northern California and Southern California in the West region tournament and Texas East and Texas West (whose areas encompass more than the geographical areas of East Texas and West Texas, splitting roughly along the I-35/I-37 corridor) compete in the Southwest region tournament. Up through 2018, the Dakotas had one district spanning the two states, and its winner became the joint champion when advancing to the Midwest region tournament. However, beginning in 2019, North Dakota and South Dakota are represented by individual teams in the regional tournament—creating an odd number of seven teams in the Midwest Regional.

The state champions (as well as the Northern California, Southern California, Texas East, Texas West, and District of Columbia teams) compete in one of eight different regional tournaments (increasing to 10 in 2022). Each regional tournament winner then advances to the Little League World Series. A comprehensive breakdown of current and historical US regional tournament locations, participants and results is available online. Since the geographical boundaries of the District of Columbia are exactly the same as the capital city of Washington, this District is usually identified specifically as "Washington, DC."

Other countries and regions pick their own way of crowning a champion. Little League Canada holds tournaments at the provincial and divisional level to field six champions (four provincial and two divisional) at the national tournament: Alberta, Ontario, Quebec, British Columbia, the Prairie Provinces (Saskatchewan and Manitoba), and the Atlantic Provinces. The host site of the national tournament varies from year to year, and the host team gets an automatic berth as the seventh team. The tournament is played as a round robin and uses the Page playoff format. The winner of the national tournament earns the right to represent Canada at the Little League World Series.

Regions

Beginning with the 2022 tournament, 10 regional tournament winners compete in the United States bracket of the Little League World Series. The states those regional champions could possibly hail from are as listed below using U.S. state abbreviations. There are 53 total U.S. entrants that compete in the 10 regional tournaments: two from Texas, two from California, one each from the remaining 48 U.S. states, and one from the District of Columbia.

 Great Lakes (MI, OH, IN, IL, KY)
 Metro (CT, NJ, NY, RI)
 Mid-Atlantic (PA, MD, DC, DE)
 Midwest (ND, SD, NE, KS, MN, IA, WI, MO)
 Mountain (NV, MT, UT, WY)
 New England (ME, MA, NH, VT)
 Northwest (AK, WA, OR, ID)
 Southeast (VA, WV, NC, SC, GA, FL, AL, TN)
 Southwest (MS, LA, AR, TX East, TX West, OK, CO, NM)
 West (AZ, Northern CA, Southern CA, HI)

There are eight international divisions, which provide 10 teams to the international bracket of the tournament. This is due to Cuba, Panama, and Puerto Rico receiving automatic bids to the LLWS on a rotating basis—annually, two teams receive a bid while the other plays through its regional tournament (Cuba or Puerto Rico through the Caribbean region; Panama through Latin America region).

 Asia-Pacific and Middle East
 Australia
 Canada
 Caribbean
 Europe and Africa
 Japan
 Latin America
 Mexico

The above regions reflect various historical realignments, including those implemented in 2013 and 2022. Historical detail is provided in articles about the individual regions.

Divisions which compete in the United States bracket represent 96% of worldwide players in Little League with over 2.2 million participants, while the divisions in the International bracket represent the remaining 4% (less than 130,000 participants).

World Series tournament format

Currently, the Little League World Series consists of 20 teams: 10 from the United States, and 10 from other countries.

From the inaugural 1947 tournament through 1956, there were predominantly U.S.-based teams, usually eight, competing in a single-elimination format. One Canadian team played in 1952, and one in 1953. Regions were introduced in 1957, and that tournament included the first non-U.S. champion, Monterrey, Mexico, although they represented the U.S. South region. International regions were added in 1958. From 1962 through 2000, the eight teams in the tournament came from four U.S and four international regions:
 United States: Central, East, South, West
 International: Canada, Europe, Far East, Latin America

Through 1975, all teams competed in one bracket. That year, the tournament was held with only the teams from the U.S. regions. The international teams returned in 1976, when two brackets were established, one with U.S. teams, and the other with international teams. The U.S. bracket winner and the international bracket winner would then meet in the championship game, an arrangement that has continued to the present, independent of subsequent changes made to early rounds of the tournament.

In 2001, the number of regions was doubled to 16. The tournament started with eight U.S. teams, randomly assigned into two four-team pools; and eight international teams, also randomly assigned into two four-team pools. Teams competed round-robin within their own pool, with the top two teams of each pool advancing to single-elimination play for a spot in the U.S. final or international final, followed by the U.S champion and international champion meeting in the World Championship game.

In 2010, round-robin play was replaced by a double-elimination bracket in each four-team pool. The winners of each pool advanced to a single-elimination U.S. championship or international championship game, with those winners advancing to the World Championship game. Additionally, each team in the tournament played a minimum of three games, as any team that lost its first two games would play in a consolation U.S. vs. international game.

In 2011, pools were eliminated, with the eight U.S. teams continuing to compete in one bracket and the eight international teams in another bracket. The tournament is double-elimination until the U.S. championship and international championship games, which remain single-elimination, with those winners advancing to the World Championship game. Each team in the tournament still plays a minimum of three games, via consolation games as noted above.

In August 2019, organizers announced that the tournament would expand to 20 teams in 2021, by adding two U.S. participants and two international participants. However, the expansion was delayed to 2022 due to the COVID-19 pandemic.

Venues

Two venues host World Series games: Howard J. Lamade Stadium and Little League Volunteer Stadium. Lamade Stadium has hosted games since 1959 and added lights in 1992. Volunteer Stadium opened in 2001 when the field expanded to 16 teams. Prior to 1959, the Little League World Series was held at Original Little League on West Fourth Street in Williamsport.

Both fields have symmetrical fences, with a distance of 68.6 m (225 feet) from home plate to each of the outfield positions. That distance had been 62.5 m (205 feet) before 2006.

Admission to all LLWS games is free for all spectators. However, stadium seats for the championship game are distributed in a random drawing of all interested parties due to high demand. Some early round games, mostly games with Pennsylvania teams, will use first-come, first-served admission if a big crowd is to be expected. Lamade Stadium has a berm beyond the fences that has allowed the facility to hold up to 45,000 spectators.

Age requirements
From 1947 to 2005, the age limit for players was set at children who turned 13 on August 1 of that year or later. In 2006, the age limit was loosened to include players who turn 13 after April 30. As the Series takes place in August, this led to many of the players having already turned 13 before the Series started. In 2014 Little League voted to change the age cutoff from April 30 to December 31. However, this caused outrage by parents because the players born between May 1 and August 31, 2005 would have lost their 12-year-old season because they would be considered to be 13 years old even though they have not reached their 13th birthday. Effective November 2015, a new implementation plan was established, which "grandfathered" players born between May 1 and August 31, 2005 as 12-year-olds for the 2018 season, using April 30 age determination date for the 2018 season. Since 2019, a new determination date of August 31 is used, banning 13-year-old players from participating in the Series.

Girls in the tournament
Through the 2022 tournament, a total of 21 girls have participated in the Little League Baseball World Series:
1984 – Victoria Roche (Brussels, Belgium)
1989 – Victoria Brucker (San Pedro, CA, US)
1990 – Kelly Craig (Trail, BC, Canada)
1991 – Giselle Hardy (Dhahran, Saudi Arabia)
1994 – Krissy Wendell (Brooklyn Center, MN, US)
1998 – Sayaka Tsushima  (Osaka, Japan)
1999 – Alicia Hunolt (Ramstein, Germany)
2001 – Tatiana Maltseva (Moscow, Russia)
2002 – Sanoe Aina (Waipahu, HI, US)
2003 – Merced Flores (Agana, Guam)
2004 – Meghan Sims (Owensboro, KY, US) and Alexandra Bellini (Ottawa, ON, Canada)
2008 – Brielle Meno  (Yona, Guam)
2009 – Katie Reyes (Vancouver, BC, Canada) and Bryn Stonehouse (Dhahran, Saudi Arabia)
2013 – Eliska Stejsklova (Moravia, Czech Republic)
2014 – Emma March (Vancouver, BC, Canada) and Mo'ne Davis (Philadelphia, PA, US)
2019 – Maddy Freking (Coon Rapids, MN, US)
2021 – Ella Bruning (Abilene, TX, US)
2022 – Falynn Randall (Santa Clara, UT, US)

Noteworthy events
  – A team from Montreal, Canada, became the first team outside of the United States to play in the tournament.
  – The first walk-off home run in the championship game was hit by Rich Cominski, from Morrisville, Pennsylvania, in the 7th inning.
  – Monterrey, Mexico, only the third team from outside the United States to compete, became the first such team to win the tournament. Pitcher Miguel Ángel Macias threw a perfect game, which has not occurred in a championship game since.
  – Lloyd McClendon, from Gary, Indiana, hit five home runs in five official at bats over the span of three games. He was intentionally walked in his other five plate appearances.
  – International teams were banned from the tournament, due to allegations of teams from Taiwan using out-of-district players.
  – International teams returned to the tournament, with US teams and non-US teams now placed on different sides of the tournament bracket.
  – Kirkland, Washington, won the championship over Chiayi County, Taiwan. This snapped a streak of 31 consecutive wins by Taiwanese teams at the LLWS, prompting the game's live announcer, Jim McKay, to declare it the biggest upset in the history of Little League.
  – Long Beach, California, became the first team from the United States to win consecutive championships.
  – Michael Memea, from Ewa Beach, Hawaii, won the championship with a walk-off home run in the 7th inning.
  – Dalton Carriker, from Warner Robins, Georgia, hit a walk off home run in the 8th inning in the championship game.
  – A team from Lugazi, Uganda, became the first team from Africa to play in the tournament.
  – The team from Maine–Endwell, New York, completed an undefeated season (24–0) by defeating Seoul for the championship, giving South Korea its first loss in a LLWS championship game.
  – For the first time in its history, the tournament was canceled, due to impact of the COVID-19 pandemic.
   – For the first time since , the tournament was restricted to US-based teams, due to continued impact of the COVID-19 pandemic.

Little League World Series champions

‡ Forfeits due to ineligible players:
 Zamboanga City, Philippines, was disqualified and stripped of its 1992 world championship; the world championship was reallocated to Long Beach, California.
 Chicago was disqualified and stripped of the U.S. championship in 2014; the U.S. championship was reallocated to Las Vegas, Nevada, which lost the U.S. championship match to Chicago.

Championship tally

Championships won by country/state

Championship notes
 In November 1974, Little League Baseball banned all non-U.S. teams from the World Series for the  event. After considerable criticism, the ban was rescinded prior to the 1976 event.
 In , the tournament was split into two brackets; one for International teams, and one for teams representing the United States. As a result, a team representing the United States is assured of being in the finals each year.
 In , Mexicali, Mexico, represented the West Region of the United States in the Little League World Series. Because of its proximity to the El Centro/Calexico area in Southern California, Mexicali competed in and represented California's District 22 in the Southern California division from 1957 to 1985, representing the bordering city of Calexico, California.
 In , Long Beach was declared a 6–0 winner after the international tournament committee determined that Zamboanga City had used ineligible players that were either not from within its city limits, over age, or both. The championship game was originally won by Zamboanga City, 15–4.
 From 1997 to 2002, no teams from Taiwan participated in the tournament. In 1997, the Taiwan Baseball Association decided its leagues would no longer charter with Little League, claiming inability to comply with rules enacted in 1992 regarding the maximum size of player pools and number of participating teams in leagues based at schools, and residency requirements, which Little League Baseball had stated it would enforce more strictly, especially after the 1992 incident. From the introduction of Far East teams in 1967 until after 1996, Taiwan had won 17 of a possible 30 championships and had been runner-up twice.
Due to complicated relations with the People's Republic of China, the Republic of China—commonly known as Taiwan—is recognized by the name Chinese Taipei by a majority of international organizations, including Little League Baseball. LLWS records and news accounts may use Republic of China, Taiwan, or Chinese Taipei to refer to the same entity.
 In , a team from Taiwan reached the championship match for the first time since 1991 (see above regarding Taiwan's absence from 1997 to 2002), but lost to a team from Chula Vista, California.
 In , Chicago defeated Las Vegas for the U.S. championship before losing to Seoul, South Korea, in the LLWS championship. On February 11, 2015, Chicago was stripped of its U.S. title for fielding ineligible players; it was retroactively awarded to Las Vegas.
 In , River Ridge became the first team since the expansion to 16 teams in 2001, and the second team in tournament history, to win the LLWS after losing their first game of tournament play (the first such team was Maracaibo, Venezuela, winners of the  tournament).

Notable participants in the Little League World Series

Major League Baseball players
 Wilson Álvarez – Former MLB player / (1982 World Series) Maracaibo, Venezuela.
 Jim Barbieri – Former MLB player / First player to play in a World Series, and a Little League World Series / 1966 MLB World Series / (1954 World Series champion) Schenectady, New York 1953 LLWS World Series runner-up / Played in back to back LLWS World Series.
 Jason Bay – Former MLB player / 2004 National League (NL) Rookie of the Year / (1990 World Series) Trail, British Columbia.
 Derek Bell – Former MLB player / 1992 MLB World Series champion / (1980 runner-up & 1981 World Series runner-up) Tampa, Florida.
 Cody Bellinger – MLB player for the Los Angeles Dodgers / 2007 World Series / Chandler, Arizona North Little League
 Christian Bethancourt – MLB player for the Tampa Bay Rays / (2004 World Series) Panama City, Panama.
 Larvell Blanks – Former MLB player / (1962 World Series) Del Rio, Texas.
 Jim Brower – Former MLB pitcher / (1985 World Series) East Tonka, Minnesota.
 Sean Burroughs – Former MLB player / (1992 & 1993 World Series champions) Long Beach, California.
 Kevin Cash – Former MLB player / Current manager for the Tampa Bay Rays, 2007 MLB World Series champion with the Boston Red Sox / (1989 World Series) Tampa, Florida.
 Gavin Cecchini – MLB Player / (2006 World Series) Lake Charles, Louisiana.
 Chin-Feng Chen – Former MLB player / First Taiwanese-born player in MLB history / (1990 World Series champion) Tainan County, Taiwan.
 Jeff Clement – Former MLB player / (1996 World Series) Marshalltown, Iowa.
 Michael Conforto – MLB player / (2004 World Series) Redmond North, Washington.
 Billy Connors – Former MLB player / (1954 World Series), Schenectady, New York 1953 LLWS runner-up Schenectady, New York. / Played in back to back LLWS.
 David Cortés – Former MLB player / 1985 World Series (1985 US champions) Mexicali, Mexico.
 Stephen Fife – Former MLB player / (1999 World Series) Boise, Idaho.
 Jeff Frazier – Former MLB player / (1995 & 1996 World Series) Toms River, New Jersey.
 Todd Frazier – Former MLB player / 2015 MLB Home Run Derby champion / (1998 World Series champion) Toms River, New Jersey.
 Jace Fry – MLB player / (2006) Beaverton, Oregon.
 Randal Grichuk – MLB player for the Colorado Rockies / (2003 & 2004 World Series) Richmond, Texas.
 Ben Hayes - Former MLB player for the Cincinnati Reds / (1970 Little League World Series) Wiesbaden, Germany
 Charlie Hayes – Former MLB player / 1996 MLB World Series champion / (1977 World Series) Hattiesburg, Mississippi.
 Yonny Hernández, MLB player for the Arizona Diamondbacks / (2011 World Series) Maracay, Venezuela
 Ken Hubbs – Former MLB player / 1962 National League (NL) Rookie of the Year & Gold Glove Winner / (1954 World Series) Colton, California.
 Erik Johnson – Former MLB player / (1978 World Series US champion, WS runner-up) San Ramon, California.
 Scott Kingery – MLB player / Philadelphia Phillies 2006 Little League World Series, Ahwatukee Little League, Phoenix, Arizona 
 Keith Lampard – Former MLB player / (1958 World Series) Portland, Oregon.
 Carney Lansford – Former MLB player, 1988 & 1990 MLB World Series runner-up / 1989 MLB World Series champion / 1981 MLB Batting champ / 1988 American League (AL) All Star / 1992 Hutch Award Winner / (1969 World Series) Santa Clara, California.
 Josh Lester - MLB player Detroit Tigers - 2006 Little League World Series - Columbus Northern Georgia LL - 2006 Little league world champions
 Adam Loewen – Former MLB player for the Arizona Diamondbacks / (1996 World Series) Surrey, British Columbia.
 Vance Lovelace – Former MLB player / (1975 World Series) Tampa, Florida.
 Lance Lynn – MLB player for the Chicago White Sox / (1999 World Series) Brownsburg, Indiana.
 Jason Marquis – Former MLB player  / 2005 NL Silver Slugger Award / 2006 MLB World Series champion / 2009 National League (NL) All Star / (1991 World Series) Staten Island, New York.
 Lloyd McClendon – Former MLB player / (1971 World Series runner-up) Gary, Indiana.
 Lastings Milledge – Former MLB player / (1997 World Series) Bradenton, Florida.
 Bobby Mitchell – Former MLB player / (1967 World Series) Northridge, California.
 Max Moroff – MLB Player / (2005 World Series) Maitland, Florida.
 Jim Pankovits – Former MLB player / (1968 World Series Runner-up) Richmond, Virginia.
 Francisco Peña – Former MLB player / (2001 World Series) Bronx, New York.
 Yusmeiro Petit – MLB player / 2014 World Series champion with the San Francisco Giants / (1994 World Series champion) Maracaibo, Venezuela. Only Player to win a LLWS title and an MLB World Series Title.
 Marc Pisciotta – Former MLB player / (1983 World Series) Marietta, Georgia.
 Boog Powell – Former MLB player / 1969 & 1971 MLB World Series runner-up / 1966 & 1970 MLB World Series champion / (1954 World Series) Lakeland, Florida.
 Nick Pratto – MLB player for the Kansas City Royals / (2011 World Series champion) Huntington Beach, California.
 Yohel Pozo – MLB player (2009 World Series) Maracaibo, Venezuela
 Jurickson Profar – MLB player for the San Diego Padres / (2004 World Series champion / 2005 World Series runner-up) Willemstad, Curaçao.
 Guillermo Quiróz – Former MLB player / (1994 World Series champion) Maracaibo, Venezuela.
 Colby Rasmus – Former MLB player / (1999 World Series runner-up) Phenix City, Alabama.
 Cory Rasmus – Former MLB player / (1999 World Series runner-up) Phenix City, Alabama.
 Brady Rodgers – Former MLB player / (2003 World Series) Richmond, Texas.
 Michael Saunders – Former MLB player / (1999 World Series) Victoria, British Columbia.
 Jonathan Schoop – MLB player for the Detroit Tigers / (2003 World Series & 2004 World Series champion) Willemstad, Curaçao.
 Gary Sheffield – Former MLB player / 1997 MLB World Series champion / 1992 MLB Batting Champ / 7-Time National League (NL) All-Star / 2-Time American League (AL) All-Star / 5-Time Silver Slugger Award / (1980 World Series runner-up) Tampa, Florida.
 Andrew Stevenson – MLB player for the Washington Nationals / (2005) Lafayette, Louisiana.
 Carl Taylor – Former MLB player / (1954 World Series) Lakeland, Florida.
 Rubén Tejada – MLB player / (2001 World Series) Santiago de Veraguas, Panama.
 Clete Thomas – Former MLB player / (1996 World Series) Panama City, Florida.
 Héctor Torres – Former MLB player / (1958 World Series Champions) Monterrey, Mexico.
 Devon Travis – Former MLB player / (2003 World Series Runner-up) Boynton Beach, Florida.
 Carlos "Bobby" Treviño – Former MLB player / (1958 World Series champions) Monterrey, Mexico.
 George Tsamis – Former MLB player / (1979 World Series Runner- up) Campbell, California.
 Jason Varitek – Former MLB player / 2004 and 2007 World Series Champion Boston Red Sox / 1984 Little League World Series US Champion / LL World Series Runner-up Altamonte Springs, Florida
 Dave Veres – Former MLB player / (1978 World Series) Torrejón AFB, Spain.
 Ed Vosberg – Former MLB player / 1997 MLB World Series Won 1997 World Series The Florida Marlins / Won NCAA World Series title with University of Arizona / (1973 World Series runner-up) Tucson, Arizona.
 Dan Wilson – Former MLB player / 1996 American League (AL) All-Star / (1981 World Series) Barrington, Illinois.
 Rick Wise – Former MLB player / Played in 1975 World Series with the Boston Red Sox (1958 World Series) Portland, Oregon.

National Football League players
 Matt Cassel – Former NFL quarterback / (1994 World Series runner-up) Northridge, California.
 Jake Fromm – NFL quarterback / (2011 Little League World Series) Warner Robins, Georgia
 Gale Gilbert – Former NFL quarterback / Played in 4 Super Bowls: XXV–XXVII with the Buffalo Bills and XXIX with the San Diego Chargers / (1974 World Series runner-up) Red Bluff, California.
 Billy Hunter – Former NFL player / U.S. Prosecutor for Northern District of California / Executive Director of the National Basketball Players Association / (1955 World Series runner-up) Delaware Township, New Jersey.
 Jack Losch – Former NFL player for the Green Bay Packers / (1947 World Series) Williamsport, Pennsylvania.
 Trey Quinn – NFL Wide receiver for the Denver Broncos / (2008 World Series) Lake Charles, Louisiana.
 Turk Schonert – Former NFL player /  Played in Super Bowl XVI & XXIII with the Cincinnati Bengals   / (1968 World Series) Garden Grove, California.
 Brian Sipe – Former NFL quarterback & 1980 NFL MVP / (1961 World Series) El Cajon, California.
 Julian Vandervelde – NFL player for the Philadelphia Eagles / (2000 World Series) Davenport, Iowa.

National Hockey League players
 Chris Drury – Former NHL player / Current president and general manager for the New York Rangers / 2001 Stanley Cup champion / 1998 Hobey Baker Award winner / 1999 Calder Memorial Trophy winner / (1989 World Series champion) Trumbull, Connecticut.
 Ray Ferraro – Former NHL player / (1976 World Series) Trail, British Columbia.
 Stephane Matteau – Former NHL player / 1994 Stanley Cup champion / (1982 World Series) Rouyn-Noranda, Quebec.
 Pierre Turgeon – Former NHL player / 4-time NHL All-Star / (1982 World Series) Rouyn-Noranda, Quebec.

Other
 Danny Almonte – The center of significant controversy following the 2001 series due to age falsification / (2001 World Series) Bronx, New York.
 Mo'ne Davis – First girl to record a win as a pitcher and to pitch a shutout / First little league player to appear on the cover of Sports Illustrated at the time of tournament play / 2014 AP Female Athlete of the Year (2014 World Series) Philadelphia.
 Austin Dillon – 2011 NASCAR Camping World Truck Series champion / 2013 NASCAR Nationwide Series champion / (2002 World Series) Forsyth County, North Carolina.
 Krissy Wendell –  Former U.S. women's national hockey team player / Current amateur scout for the Pittsburgh Penguins / (1994 World Series) Brooklyn Park, Minnesota.

Media coverage

The first broadcast of the Little League World Series on television was on ABC Sports (now ESPN on ABC) in 1963. For years, only the championship game was televised. Since the late 1980s, when the tournament was reorganized, both the U.S. and international championships, the "semifinals", have been shown. As the years passed, more telecasts were added on ABC, ESPN, and ESPN2. In 2006, 28 of the 36 games were televised on the three networks. In addition, several regional tournament games, which are qualifiers for the LLWS, are televised on ESPN during the days leading up to the LLWS.

The 2006 world championship game was to be the last telecast on ABC Sports before ESPN's complete takeover of the sports division and name change. However, the final was postponed one day because of rain and was shown by ESPN2.

In January 2007, it was announced that ESPN, ESPN2, and ABC had extended their contract with the Little League organization through 2014. That year, every game of the LLWS was scheduled to be televised for the first time, with all but one game live on ESPN, ESPN2, or ABC. (The other game was to be available online at ESPN360, then shown on ESPN2 the next day.)  In addition, a number of games were to be shown in high-definition on ESPN, ESPN2, and ABC. The championship games in all other divisions, as well as the semifinals and finals of the Little League Softball World Series, was scheduled for either ESPN, ESPN2 or ESPNU.

In June 2011, it was announced that ESPN would add 17 games to its schedule on ESPN 3D.

Coverage of the qualifying games has increased substantially in the US within the past decade: as of 2018, all regional group games (with the exception of the Southwest region) are available via subscription online through the ESPN+ platform, with the last three games of each regional tournament on an ESPN network. The aforementioned Southwest regional games are aired in full on the Longhorn Network (itself owned by ESPN). The increased level of participation, competition, and publicity of the Little League World Series in recent years has established a trend in the opposite direction of many other preteen sports.

Most LLWS games are broadcast live on local radio station WRAK 1400AM, which is owned by Clear Channel. The radio broadcasts are also streamed online at the LLWS page at littleleague.org.

Other divisions in Little League Baseball
After discontinuing their big league divisions in 2017, seven of the remaining eleven divisions of Little League Baseball has its own World Series format (including three in girls' softball).

See also
 List of Little League World Series champions by division
 List of Little League World Series broadcasters
 Little League World Series on television
 The Little League World Series Baseball video game series published by Activision
 Mexico in the Little League World Series
 Amateur baseball in the United States
 U-12 Baseball World Cup, the most elite and highest level of U-12 baseball competition, sanctioned by the World Baseball Softball Confederation (WBSC) and held every 2 years.
 List of organized baseball leagues
  (world, international-bracket, and regional champions)
  (national, regional, and state champions)

References

External links

 
 Peter J. McGovern Little League Museum
 The Little League Baseball International Tournament (comprehensive information on district, sectional, state/provincial/country, and regional tournaments). Unpage Publications

 
1947 in baseball
Recurring sporting events established in 1947
Annual sporting events in the United States